Aarón Galindo Rubio (born 8 May 1982) is a Mexican former professional footballer who played as a centre-back.

Biography
Born in Mexico City, Mexico, Galindo began practicing with Cruz Azul at the young age of six, climbing up the youth ranks. Finally Galindo made his debut with the first team in the 2002 spring season, and was a solid starter by the 2003 Clausura season. Galindo was a member of the senior national team, and has played for numerous Mexico youth teams; a starter for the U-23 team at the 2004 Summer Olympics.

Two games into the 2005 FIFA Confederations Cup, Galindo along with teammate (of both club and country) Salvador Carmona were separated from the rest of the national team staying in Göttingen, Germany. Initially disciplinary problems was the explanation given by the Mexico federation for the separation, the federation later confirmed both players tested positive for performance enhancement drugs. Both men received a one-year ban from competition, which barred Galindo from playing in the 2005 Apertura, 2006 Clausura seasons, and the 2006 FIFA World Cup.

Hércules CF
Galindo signed in the summer of 2006 with Hércules CF of the Spanish second division. Despite being considered a major signing by the club he played very few games and was on the bench for most of the season.

Grasshopper Club Zürich
Galindo signed a contract with Swiss team Grasshopper Club Zürich in February 2007. Galindo capped his first goal with Grasshopper Club Zürich and in the Swiss Super League on 17 February 2007 against FC Thun. He scored the first goal in the match for Grasshoppers in the 49th minute. The goal came after teammate Diego León's pass to Sreto Ristić, who in turn gave a through pass to Galindo. Taking advantage of the opportunity, Galindo's shot ended up in Thun's nets. His first goal contributed to Grasshoppers' 2–0 win over Thun.

Eintracht Frankfurt
On 28 July 2007, it was announced that Galindo had signed a two-year contract at the German club Eintracht Frankfurt.

Guadalajara
On 8 January 2009, Galindo left Frankfurt to return to his native Mexico to play for Club Deportivo Guadalajara to sign a four-year contract. On 28 February 2009, Galindo scored his first goal with Chivas de Guadalajara in a 5–0 win over C.F. Pachuca in the Jalisco Stadium.

Santos Laguna
On 7 June 2011, Galindo signed with Santos Laguna.

Toluca
After seeing less action on the pitch with Santos Laguna he was loaned to Toluca on 8 July 2013, where he competes for the starting line up with Paulo Da Silva, Edgar Dueñas and Francisco Gamboa.

Toledo
On 1 September 2017, Galindo returned to Spain after agreeing to a contract with CD Toledo.

Career statistics

International

Honours
Santos Laguna
Mexican Primera División: Clausura 2012

Mexico U23
CONCACAF Olympic Qualifying Championship: 2004

References

External links
 
 Aarón Galindo at eintracht-archiv.de 
 

1982 births
Living people
Footballers from Mexico City
Association football central defenders
Mexican footballers
Mexico international footballers
Footballers at the 2004 Summer Olympics
Olympic footballers of Mexico
2005 FIFA Confederations Cup players
Cruz Azul footballers
Hércules CF players
Grasshopper Club Zürich players
Eintracht Frankfurt players
C.D. Guadalajara footballers
Santos Laguna footballers
Deportivo Toluca F.C. players
CD Toledo players
Liga MX players
Swiss Super League players
Bundesliga players
Mexican expatriate footballers
Expatriate footballers in Spain
Expatriate footballers in Switzerland
Expatriate footballers in Germany
Mexican expatriate sportspeople in Germany
Mexican expatriate sportspeople in Spain
Mexican expatriate sportspeople in Switzerland
Mexican sportspeople in doping cases
Doping cases in association football
Central American and Caribbean Games silver medalists for Mexico
Competitors at the 2002 Central American and Caribbean Games
Central American and Caribbean Games medalists in football
Footballers at the 2003 Pan American Games
Pan American Games bronze medalists for Mexico
Medalists at the 2003 Pan American Games
Pan American Games medalists in football